The Insurance Bureau of Canada (IBC) is a trade association representing home, auto, and business insurance companies in Canada. Established in 1964, it promotes and lobbies for the insurance industry to governments and the general public.

IBC member companies represent 90 percent of the Canadian property and casualty (P&C) insurance market.

References

External links 
 

Insurance industry organizations
1964 establishments in Canada
Trade associations based in Canada
Lobbying organizations in Canada
Insurance in Canada
Organizations based in Toronto